Camille Barrère (23 October 1851 – 7 October 1940) was a French diplomat, most notably the ambassador to Italy from 1897 to 1924. In 1902, Barrère negotiated a secret accord with Italian Minister of Foreign Affairs Giulio Prinetti that ended the two nation's historical rivalry for North Africa. The Prinetti-Barrère Accord stated that, in the event of a redistribution of Ottoman lands in northern Africa, France would not contest an Italian claim on the lands of the Tripolitania Vilayet, which makes up modern Libya. In return, Italy would not contest a French claim on the Ottoman territory of Morocco. This agreement allowed for the French Agadir Crisis in Morocco in 1911 and the Italo-Turkish War of 1911-1912 that resulted in the taking of those territories. Barrère also was a key figure in arranging the 1915 secret Treaty of London between Italy and the Triple Entente that resulted in Italy abandoning its Triple Alliance partners of Germany and Austro-Hungary during the First World War.

Barrère had sympathy for the early fascist movements in Italy and "viewed the nascent fascist movement with almost unalloyed favour and enthusiasm." Reportedly, he even personally provided financial support to Benito Mussolini.

Barrère, who participated in all international sanitary conferences since that of 1892 –giving him the informal title of the "Mathusalem of international sanitary action"– was one of the driving forces behind the founding of the Office international d'hygiène publique (created in 1906, it is seen as a predecessor of WHO with which it was merged after World War II).

See also 
 Office international d'hygiène publique
League of Nations
 International Sanitary Conferences
 Foreign relations of France
France–Italy relations
Treaty of London (1915)
Société financière française et coloniale

References

1851 births
1940 deaths
People from Nièvre
Ambassadors of France to Italy
19th-century French diplomats
20th-century French diplomats
Members of the Académie des sciences morales et politiques